Ben Hurley is a stand up comedian from New Zealand. Hurley started his comedy career in Wellington as resident host of The Wellington Comedy Club. After winning the Billy T Award he moved to London and worked on the comedy circuit there between 2005 and 2008. He has supported the likes of Andy Parsons, Stewart Lee and Ed Byrne on their UK Tours.
He is a popular act in his home country of New Zealand where he has performed as part of the New Zealand International Comedy Festival 10 years in a row.

His comedy is largely based on his experiences growing up in the rural Taranaki region of New Zealand but also deals with topics like relationships, religion, music, politics and his family.

He is constantly touring having played all over the UK, Ireland, parts of Asia and Australia and, of course, extensively in New Zealand.

Ben's TV credits in New Zealand are numerous, including work on a TV3 panel show called 7 Days as a writer and core cast member. He has also featured in 8 NZ Comedy Festival Galas, in the AotearoHA series Funny Roots and his own stand-up comedy special called After Hours. In 2021 he appeared on the panel show Patriot Brains.

NZ Comedy Festival Shows
2002 "Comedion" (with Steve Wrigley and mrs.peacock)
2003 "Bigger than Ben Hurley"
2004 "Political and Stuff"
2005 "Comedy Convoy" (with Stewart Lee, Rhys Darby, Michèle A’Court and Carl Barron)
2006 "Here I go again on my own"
2007 "The Big Show"(with Mickey D and Alun Cochrane)
2008 "Boom!"
2009 "Actually, I do Mind"
2010 "Ultra mega alright"
2011 "Do the Evolution"
2012 "Live and Unleashed" (with Steve Wrigley)
2013 "More Live and More unleashed" (with Steve Wrigley)
2014 "The Reckoning"
2015 "Ben defend New Zealand" (with guests) 
2016 "Earth, Planet, World"
2017 "22 Rants About F**k"

Awards
2002 TV2's Pulp Comedy Best New Face
2004 Billy T Award Winner
2004 NZ Comedy Guild Best Male Comedian
2008 Fred Dagg Award Winner

References

New Zealand comedians
New Zealand male comedians
Year of birth missing (living people)
Living people
People from Taranaki